Keith Bostic is an American software engineer and one of the key people in the history of Berkeley Software Distribution (BSD) Unix and open-source software.

In 1986, Bostic joined the Computer Systems Research Group (CSRG) at the University of California, Berkeley. He was one of the principal architects of the Berkeley 2BSD, 4.4BSD and 4.4BSD-Lite releases. Among many other tasks, he led the effort at CSRG to create a free software version of BSD Unix, which helped allow the creation of FreeBSD, NetBSD and OpenBSD.

Bostic was a founder of Berkeley Software Design Inc. (BSDi), which produced BSD/OS, a proprietary version of BSD.

In 1993, the USENIX Association gave a Lifetime Achievement Award (Flame) to the Computer Systems Research Group, honoring 180 individuals, including Bostic, who contributed to the group's 4.4BSD-Lite release.

Bostic and his wife Margo Seltzer founded Sleepycat Software in 1996 to develop and commercialize Berkeley DB, an open-source, key-value database. Sleepycat Software was the first company to develop dual-licensed open-source software. In February 2006, the company was acquired by Oracle Corporation, where Bostic worked until 2008.

Bostic and Michael Cahill founded WiredTiger in 2010 to create a NoSQL database management system. In November 2014, the company was acquired by MongoDB, which employed Bostic.

Bostic is the author of nvi – a re-implementation of the classic text editor vi – and many other standard BSD and Linux utilities. He is a past member of the Association for Computing Machinery, IEEE, and several POSIX working groups, and a contributor to POSIX standards.

Publications
 M. McKusick, K. Bostic, M. Karels, J. Quarterman: The Design and Implementation of the 4.4BSD Operating System, Addison-Wesley, April 1996, . French translation published 1997, International Thomson Publishing, Paris, France, .

References

External links

Free software programmers
University of California, Berkeley people
BSD people
1959 births
Living people
Place of birth missing (living people)
American technology company founders
Businesspeople in software
American computer businesspeople